The Spanish Peaks Regional Health Center is a regional hospital near Walsenburg, Colorado. Founded in 1993, the medical center currently has 20 licensed beds.

The health center also operates the 120-bed Spanish Peaks Veterans Community Living Center, a nursing home, on the same property.
 
The hospital is a Level IV trauma center and a critical access hospital. It is located directly across the highway from Lathrop State Park.

References

External links
Hospital website
 

Hospitals in Colorado
Buildings and structures in Huerfano County, Colorado
Hospitals established in 1993